Solute carrier family 12 member 6 is a protein that in humans is encoded by the SLC12A6 gene.

This gene is a member of the K-Cl cotransporter (KCC) family. K-Cl cotransporters are integral membrane proteins that lower intracellular chloride concentrations below the electrochemical equilibrium potential. The proteins encoded by this gene are activated by cell swelling induced by hypotonic conditions. Alternate splicing results in multiple transcript variants encoding different isoforms, the most important ones being KCC3a and KCC3b. Mutations in this gene are associated with agenesis of the corpus callosum with peripheral neuropathy.

See also
 Solute carrier family

References

External links
 GeneReview/NIH/UW entry on Hereditary Motor and Sensory Neuropathy with Agenesis of the Corpus Callosum

Further reading

Solute carrier family